The Men's 10 metre platform competition at the 2022 World Aquatics Championships was held on 2 and 3 July 2022.

Results
The preliminary round was started on 2 July at 10:00. The semifinal was held on 2 July at 16:00. The final was held on 3 July at 17:00.

Green denotes finalists

Blue denotes semifinalists

References

Men's 10 metre platform